The Tokyo Sports Film Award for Best Foreign Film is an award given at the Tokyo Sports Film Award.

List of winners

References

External links
 

Awards established in 1992
Japanese film awards
1992 establishments in Japan
Tokyo Sports Film Award
Lists of films by award
Film awards for Best Foreign Language Film